Thomas Benton Stoddard (December 11, 1800 – February 24, 1876) was an American lawyer and politician who served as the first mayor of La Crosse, Wisconsin.

Early life and education 
Born in Canandaigua, New York, Stoddard graduated from Columbia University and Yale University. He studied law under Aaron Burr.

Career 
In 1851, Stoddard moved to La Crosse, Wisconsin, and he was elected the first mayor of the city in 1856. In 1862, he served in the Wisconsin State Assembly.

The village of Stoddard, Wisconsin was named after Stoddard.

References

New York (state) lawyers
Mayors of La Crosse, Wisconsin
Republican Party members of the Wisconsin State Assembly
Columbia College (New York) alumni
Yale University alumni
Politicians from Canandaigua, New York
1800 births
1876 deaths
19th-century American politicians
19th-century American lawyers